The 2019 Dubai 24 Hour was the 14th running of the Dubai 24 Hour. It was also the first round of both the 2019 24H GT Series and the 2019 24H TCE Series. The event was held on 11 to 13 January at the Dubai Autodrome, United Arab Emirates.

Result

References

Dubai 24 Hour
Dubai 24 Hour
Dubai 24 Hour